"Sansoen Phra Narai" is a music composition based on a notated piece found in Simon de la Loubère's records of the French embassy to the Kingdom of Ayutthaya in 1687, originally titled in the English version as "A Siamese Song". King Chulalongkorn (Rama V) had a modern arrangement made by Michel Fusco in 1897, and used it as a royal anthem. The piece was arranged as the title song for the 1941 film King of the White Elephant, under the name "Si Ayutthaya". This arrangement was also used in the 2017 TV series , and the march composition was used in the royal funeral of King Bhumibol Adulyadej (Rama IX) the same year.

Lyrics 
The lyrics may have not been exactly accurate as it was written in an older Thai transcription, which in return, makes it hard to transcribe the lyrics into Thai.

Prince Narathip Praphanphong's transcription to Thai

See also
 Sansoen Phra Barami, the present royal anthem of Thailand
Other former Thai royal anthems
 Chom Rat Chong Charoen
 Bulan Loi Luean

References

Thai songs
Historical national anthems
Royal anthems